Vietnam or Viet Nam, officially the Socialist Republic of Vietnam (SRV), is a country in Southeast Asia. Vietnam borders China to the north, and Laos and Cambodia to the west. It shares maritime borders with Thailand through the Gulf of Thailand, and the Philippines, Indonesia, and Malaysia through the South China Sea. Its capital is Hanoi and its largest city is Ho Chi Minh City (commonly referred to by its former name, Saigon).

Vietnam was inhabited by the Paleolithic age, with states established in the first millennium BC on the Red River Delta in modern-day northern Vietnam. The Han dynasty annexed Northern and Central Vietnam under Chinese rule from 111 BC, until the first dynasty emerged in 939. Successive monarchical dynasties absorbed Chinese influences through Confucianism and Buddhism, and expanded southward to the Mekong Delta, conquering Champa. The Nguyễn—the last imperial dynasty—surrendered to France in 1883. Following the August Revolution, the nationalist Viet Minh under the leadership of communist revolutionary Ho Chi Minh proclaimed independence from France in 1945.

Vietnam went through prolonged warfare in the 20th century. After World War II, France returned to reclaim colonial power in the First Indochina War, from which Vietnam emerged victorious in 1954. As a result of treaties signed two years later, Vietnam was also separated into two parts. The Vietnam War began shortly after, between the communist North, supported by the Soviet Union and China, and the anti-communist South, supported by the United States. Upon the North Vietnamese victory in 1975, Vietnam reunified as a unitary socialist state under the Communist Party of Vietnam (CPV) in 1976. An ineffective planned economy, a trade embargo by the West, and wars with Cambodia and China crippled the country further. In 1986, the CPV initiated economic and political reforms similar to the Chinese economic reform, transforming the country to a market-oriented economy. The reforms facilitated Vietnamese reintegration into the global economy and politics.

A developing country with a lower-middle-income economy, Vietnam is nonetheless one of the fastest-growing economies of the 21st century, with a GDP predicted to rival developed nations by 2050. Vietnam has high levels of corruption and censorship and a poor human rights record; the country ranks among the lowest in international measurements of civil liberties, freedom of the press, and freedom of religion and ethnic minorities. It is part of international and intergovernmental institutions including the ASEAN, the APEC, the CPTPP, the Non-Aligned Movement, the OIF, and the WTO. It has assumed a seat on the United Nations Security Council twice.

Etymology 

The name , literally “Viet south”, means “Viet of the South” per Vietnamese word order or “South of the Viet” per Classical Chinese word order. A variation of the name, Nanyue (or Nam Việt), was first documented in the 2nd century BC. The term "" (Yue) in Early Middle Chinese was first written using the logograph "戉" for an axe (a homophone), in oracle bone and bronze inscriptions of the late Shang dynasty ( BC), and later as "越". At that time it referred to a people or chieftain to the northwest of the Shang. In the early 8th century BC, a tribe on the middle Yangtze were called the Yangyue, a term later used for peoples further south. Between the 7th and 4th centuries BC Yue/Việt referred to the State of Yue in the lower Yangtze basin and its people. From the 3rd century BC the term was used for the non-Chinese populations of southern China and northern Vietnam, with particular ethnic groups called Minyue, Ouyue, Luoyue (Vietnamese: Lạc Việt), etc., collectively called the Baiyue (Bách Việt,). The term Baiyue/Bách Việt first appeared in the book Lüshi Chunqiu compiled around 239 BC. By the 17th and 18th centuries AD, educated Vietnamese apparently referred to themselves as nguoi Viet (Viet people) or nguoi nam (southern people).

The form  is first recorded in the 16th-century oracular poem Sấm Trạng Trình. The name has also been found on 12 steles carved in the 16th and 17th centuries, including one at Bao Lam Pagoda in Hải Phòng that dates to 1558. In 1802, Nguyễn Phúc Ánh (who later became Emperor Gia Long) established the Nguyễn dynasty. In the second year of his rule, he asked the Jiaqing Emperor of the Qing dynasty to confer on him the title 'King of Nam Việt / Nanyue' ( in Chinese character) after seizing power in Annam. The Emperor refused because the name was related to Zhao Tuo's Nanyue, which included the regions of Guangxi and Guangdong in southern China. The Qing Emperor, therefore, decided to call the area "Việt Nam" instead, meaning “South of the Viet” per Classical Chinese word order but the Vietnamese understood it as “Viet of the South” per Vietnamese word order. Between 1804 and 1813, the name Vietnam was used officially by Emperor Gia Long. It was revived in the early 20th century in Phan Bội Châu's History of the Loss of Vietnam, and later by the Vietnamese Nationalist Party (VNQDĐ). The country was usually called Annam until 1945, when the imperial government in Huế adopted .

History

Prehistory and early history

Archaeological excavations have revealed the existence of humans in what is now Vietnam as early as the Paleolithic age. Stone artefacts excavated in Gia Lai province have been claimed to date to 0.78 Ma, based on associated find of tektites, however this claim has been challenged because tektites are often found in archaeological sites of various ages in Vietnam.  Homo erectus fossils dating to around 500,000 BC have been found in caves in Lạng Sơn and Nghệ An provinces in northern Vietnam. The oldest Homo sapiens fossils from mainland Southeast Asia are of Middle Pleistocene provenance, and include isolated tooth fragments from Tham Om and Hang Hum. Teeth attributed to Homo sapiens from the Late Pleistocene have been found at Dong Can, and from the Early Holocene at Mai Da Dieu, Lang Gao and Lang Cuom. By about 1,000 BC, the development of wet-rice cultivation in the Ma River and Red River floodplains led to the flourishing of Đông Sơn culture, notable for its bronze casting used to make elaborate bronze Đông Sơn drums. At this point, the early Vietnamese kingdoms of Văn Lang and Âu Lạc appeared, and the culture's influence spread to other parts of Southeast Asia, including Maritime Southeast Asia, throughout the first millennium BC.

Dynastic Vietnam 

According to Vietnamese legends, Hồng Bàng dynasty of the Hùng kings first established in 2879 BC is considered the first state in the history of Vietnam (then known as Xích Quỷ and later Văn Lang). In 257 BC, the last Hùng king was defeated by Thục Phán. He consolidated the Lạc Việt and Âu Việt tribes to form the Âu Lạc, proclaiming himself An Dương Vương. In 179 BC, a Chinese general named Zhao Tuo ("Triệu Đà") defeated An Dương Vương and consolidated Âu Lạc into Nanyue. However, Nanyue was itself incorporated into the empire of the Chinese Han dynasty in 111 BC after the Han–Nanyue War. For the next thousand years, what is now northern Vietnam remained mostly under Chinese rule. Early independence movements, such as those of the Trưng Sisters and Lady Triệu, were temporarily successful, though the region gained a longer period of independence as Vạn Xuân under the Anterior Lý dynasty between AD 544 and 602. By the early 10th century, Northern Vietnam had gained autonomy, but not sovereignty, under the Khúc family.

In AD 938, the Vietnamese lord Ngô Quyền defeated the forces of the Chinese Southern Han state at Bạch Đằng River and achieved full independence for Vietnam in 939 after a millennium of Chinese domination. By the 960s, the dynastic Đại Việt (Great Viet) kingdom was established, Vietnamese society enjoyed a golden era under the Lý and Trần dynasties. During the rule of the Trần Dynasty, Đại Việt repelled three Mongol invasions. Meanwhile, the Mahāyāna branch of Buddhism flourished and became the state religion. Following the 1406–7 Ming–Hồ War, which overthrew the Hồ dynasty, Vietnamese independence was interrupted briefly by the Chinese Ming dynasty, but was restored by Lê Lợi, the founder of the Lê dynasty. The Vietnamese polity reached their zenith in the Lê dynasty of the 15th century, especially during the reign of emperor Lê Thánh Tông (1460–1497).

From the 16th century onward, civil strife and frequent political infighting engulfed much of Dai Viet. First, the Chinese-supported Mạc dynasty challenged the Lê dynasty's power. After the Mạc dynasty was defeated, the Lê dynasty was nominally reinstalled. Actual power, however, was divided between the northern Trịnh lords and the southern Nguyễn lords, who engaged in a civil war for more than four decades before a truce was called in the 1670s. Vietnam was divided into North (Trịnh) and South (Nguyễn) from 1600 to 1777. During this period, the Nguyễn expanded southern Vietnam into the Mekong Delta, annexing the Central Highlands and the Khmer lands in the Mekong Delta. The division of the country ended a century later when the Tây Sơn brothers helped Trịnh to end Nguyễn, they also established new dynasty and ended Trịnh. However, their rule did not last long, and they were defeated by the remnants of the Nguyễn lords, led by Nguyễn Ánh. Nguyễn Ánh unified Vietnam, and established the Nguyễn dynasty, ruling under the name Gia Long.

French Indochina 

In the 1500s, the Portuguese explored the Vietnamese coast and reportedly erected a stele on the Chàm Islands to mark their presence. By 1533, they began landing in the Vietnamese delta but were forced to leave because of local turmoil and fighting. They also had less interest in the territory than they did in China and Japan. After they had settled in Macau and Nagasaki to begin the profitable Macau–Japan trade route, the Portuguese began to involve themselves in trade with Hội An. Portuguese traders and Jesuit missionaries under the Padroado system were active in both Vietnamese realms of Đàng Trong (Cochinchina or Quinan) and Đàng Ngoài (Tonkin) in the 17th century. The Dutch also tried to establish contact with Quinan in 1601 but failed to sustain a presence there after several violent encounters with the locals. The Dutch East India Company (VOC) only managed to establish official relations with Tonkin in the spring of 1637 after leaving Dejima in Japan to establish trade for silk. Meanwhile, in 1613, the first English attempt to establish contact with Hội An failed following a violent incident involving the Honourable East India Company. By 1672 the English did establish relations with Tonkin and were allowed to reside in Phố Hiến.

Between 1615 and 1753, French traders also engaged in trade in Vietnam. The first French missionaries arrived in 1658, under the Portuguese Padroado. From its foundation, the Paris Foreign Missions Society under Propaganda Fide actively sent missionaries to Vietnam, entering Cochinchina first in 1664 and Tonkin first in 1666. Spanish Dominicans joined the Tonkin mission in 1676, and Franciscans were in Cochinchina from 1719 to 1834. The Vietnamese authorities began to feel threatened by continuous Christianisation activities. After several Catholic missionaries were detained, the French Navy intervened in 1843 to free them, as the kingdom was perceived as xenophobic. In a series of conquests from 1859 to 1885, France eroded Vietnam's sovereignty. At the siege of Tourane in 1858, France was aided by Spain (with Filipino, Latin American, and Spanish troops from the Philippines) and perhaps some Tonkinese Catholics. After the 1862 Treaty, and especially after France completely conquered Lower Cochinchina in 1867, the Văn Thân movement of scholar-gentry class arose and committed violence against Catholics across central and northern Vietnam.

Between 1862 and 1867, the southern third of the country became the French colony of Cochinchina. By 1884, the entire country was under French rule, with the central and northern parts of Vietnam separated into the two protectorates of Annam and Tonkin. The three entities were formally integrated into the union of French Indochina in 1887. The French administration imposed significant political and cultural changes on Vietnamese society. A Western-style system of modern education introduced new humanist values. Most French settlers in Indochina were concentrated in Cochinchina, particularly in Saigon, and in Hanoi, the colony's capital.

During the colonial period, guerrillas of the royalist Cần Vương movement rebelled against French rule and massacred around a third of Vietnam's Christian population. After a decade of resistance, they were defeated in the 1890s by the Catholics in reprisal for their earlier massacres. Another large-scale rebellion, the Thái Nguyên uprising, was also suppressed heavily. The French developed a plantation economy to promote export of tobacco, indigo, tea and coffee. However, they largely ignored the increasing demands for civil rights and self-government.

A nationalist political movement soon emerged, with leaders like Phan Bội Châu, Phan Châu Trinh, Phan Đình Phùng, Emperor Hàm Nghi, and Hồ Chí Minh fighting or calling for independence. This resulted in the 1930 Yên Bái mutiny by the Vietnamese Nationalist Party (VNQDĐ), which the French quashed. The mutiny split the independence movement, as many leading members converted to communism.

The French maintained full control of their colonies until World War II, when the war in the Pacific led to the Japanese invasion of French Indochina in 1940. Afterwards, the Japanese Empire was allowed to station its troops in Vietnam while the pro-Vichy French colonial administration continued. Japan exploited Vietnam's natural resources to support its military campaigns, culminating in a full-scale takeover of the country in March 1945. This led to the Vietnamese Famine of 1945 which killed up to two million people.

First Indochina War 

In 1941, the Việt Minh, a nationalist liberation movement based on a communist ideology, emerged under the Vietnamese revolutionary leader Hồ Chí Minh. The Việt Minh sought independence for Vietnam from France and the end of the Japanese occupation. After the military defeat of Japan in World War II and the fall of its puppet government Empire of Vietnam in August 1945, Saigon's administrative services collapsed and chaos, riots, and murder were widespread. The Việt Minh occupied Hanoi and proclaimed a provisional government, which asserted national independence on 2 September.

In July 1945, the Allies had decided to divide Indochina at the 16th parallel to allow Chiang Kai-shek of the Republic of China to receive the Japanese surrender in the north while Britain's Lord Louis Mountbatten received their surrender in the south. The Allies agreed that Indochina still belonged to France.

But as the French were weakened by the German occupation, British-Indian forces and the remaining Japanese Southern Expeditionary Army Group were used to maintain order and help France reestablish control through the 1945–1946 War in Vietnam. Hồ initially chose to take a moderate stance to avoid military conflict with France, asking the French to withdraw their colonial administrators and for French professors and engineers to help build a modern independent Vietnam. But the Provisional Government of the French Republic did not act on these requests, including the idea of independence, and dispatched the French Far East Expeditionary Corps to restore colonial rule. This resulted in the Việt Minh launching a guerrilla campaign against the French in late 1946. The resulting First Indochina War lasted until July 1954. The defeat of French colonialists and Vietnamese loyalists in the 1954 battle of Điện Biên Phủ allowed Hồ to negotiate a ceasefire from a favourable position at the subsequent Geneva Conference.

The colonial administration was thereby ended and French Indochina was dissolved under the Geneva Accords of 21 July 1954 into three countries—Vietnam, and the kingdoms of Cambodia and Laos as well as Vietnam was further divided into North and South administrative regions at the Demilitarised Zone, roughly along the 17th parallel north (pending elections scheduled for July 1956). A 300-day period of free movement was permitted, during which almost a million northerners, mainly Catholics, moved south, fearing persecution by the communists. This migration was in large part aided by the United States military through Operation Passage to Freedom. The partition of Vietnam by the Geneva Accords was not intended to be permanent, and stipulated that Vietnam would be reunited after the elections. But in 1955, the southern State of Vietnam's prime minister, Ngô Đình Diệm, toppled Bảo Đại in a fraudulent referendum organised by his brother Ngô Đình Nhu, and proclaimed himself president of the Republic of Vietnam. This effectively replaced the internationally recognised State of Vietnam by the Republic of Vietnam in the south—supported by the United States, France, Laos, Republic of China and Thailand—and Hồ's Democratic Republic of Vietnam in the north, supported by the Soviet Union, Sweden, Khmer Rouge, and the People's Republic of China.

Vietnam War 

From 1953 to 1956, the North Vietnamese government instituted agrarian reforms including "rent reduction" and "land reform", which resulted in significant political repression. During the land reform, testimony from North Vietnamese witnesses initially suggested a ratio of one execution for every 160 village residents, which extrapolated across all of Vietnam would indicate nearly 100,000 executions. Because the campaign was concentrated mainly in the Red River Delta area, a lower estimate of 50,000 executions became widely accepted by scholars at the time, but declassified documents from the Vietnamese and Hungarian archives indicate that the number was much lower, although likely more than 13,500. In the South, Diệm countered North Vietnamese subversion (including the assassination of over 450 South Vietnamese officials in 1956) by detaining tens of thousands of suspected communists in "political reeducation centres". This program incarcerated many non-communists, but was successful at curtailing communist activity in the country, if only for a time. The North Vietnamese government claimed that 2,148 people were killed in the process by November 1957. The pro-Hanoi Việt Cộng began a guerrilla campaign in South Vietnam in the late 1950s to overthrow Diệm's government. From 1960, the Soviet Union and North Vietnam signed treaties providing for further Soviet military support.

In 1963, Buddhist discontent with Diệm's Catholic regime erupted into mass demonstrations, leading to a violent government crackdown. This led to the collapse of Diệm's relationship with the United States, and ultimately to a 1963 coup in which he and Nhu were assassinated. The Diệm era was followed by more than a dozen successive military governments, before the pairing of Air Marshal Nguyễn Cao Kỳ and General Nguyễn Văn Thiệu took control in mid-1965. Thiệu gradually outmaneuvered Kỳ and cemented his grip on power in fraudulent elections in 1967 and 1971. During this political instability, the communists began to gain ground. To support South Vietnam's struggle against the communist insurgency, the United States began increasing its contribution of military advisers, using the 1964 Gulf of Tonkin incident as a pretext for such intervention. US forces became involved in ground combat operations by 1965, and at their peak several years later, numbered more than 500,000. The US also engaged in sustained aerial bombing. Meanwhile, China and the Soviet Union provided North Vietnam with significant material aid and 15,000 combat advisers. Communist forces supplying the Việt Cộng carried supplies along the Hồ Chí Minh trail, which passed through Laos.

The communists attacked South Vietnamese targets during the 1968 Tết Offensive. The campaign failed militarily, but shocked the American establishment and turned US public opinion against the war. During the offensive, communist troops massacred over 3,000 civilians at Huế. Facing an increasing casualty count, rising domestic opposition to the war, and growing international condemnation, the US began withdrawing from ground combat roles in the early 1970s. This also entailed an unsuccessful effort to strengthen and stabilise South Vietnam. Following the Paris Peace Accords of 27 January 1973, all American combat troops were withdrawn by 29 March 1973. In December 1974, North Vietnam captured the province of Phước Long and started a full-scale offensive, culminating in the fall of Saigon on 30 April 1975. South Vietnam was ruled by a provisional government for almost eight years while under North Vietnamese military occupation.

Reunification and reforms 

On 2 July 1976, North and South Vietnam were merged to form the Socialist Republic of Vietnam. The war devastated Vietnam and killed 966,000 to 3.8 million people. A 1974 US Senate subcommittee estimated nearly 1.4 million Vietnamese civilians were killed or wounded between 1965 and 1974—including 415,000 killed. In its aftermath, under Lê Duẩn's administration, there were no mass executions of South Vietnamese who had collaborated with the US or the defunct South Vietnamese government, confounding Western fears, but up to 300,000 South Vietnamese were sent to reeducation camps, where many endured torture, starvation, and disease while being forced to perform hard labour. The government embarked on a mass campaign of collectivisation of farms and factories. Many fled the country following the conclusion of the war. In 1978, in response to the Khmer Rouge government of Cambodia ordering massacres of Vietnamese residents in the border villages in the districts of An Giang and Kiên Giang, the Vietnamese military invaded Cambodia and removed them from power after occupying Phnom Penh. The intervention was a success, resulting in the establishment of a new, pro-Vietnam socialist government, the People's Republic of Kampuchea, which ruled until 1989. However, this worsened relations with China, which had supported the Khmer Rouge. China later launched a brief incursion into northern Vietnam in 1979, causing Vietnam to rely even more heavily on Soviet economic and military aid, while mistrust of the Chinese government escalated.

At the Sixth National Congress of the Communist Party of Vietnam (CPV) in December 1986, reformist politicians replaced the "old guard" government with new leadership. The reformers were led by 71-year-old Nguyễn Văn Linh, who became the party's new general secretary. Although the authority of the state remained unchallenged under Đổi Mới, the government encouraged private ownership of farms and factories, economic deregulation, and foreign investment, while maintaining control over strategic industries. Subsequently, Vietnam's economy achieved strong growth in agricultural and industrial production, construction, exports, and foreign investment, although these reforms also resulted in a rise in income inequality and gender disparities.

According to British journalist Nick Davies, writing for The Guardian, the long wars against the French and Americans have failed to achieve their stated goals:The reality now is that it has ended up with the worst of two systems: the authoritarian socialist state and the unfettered ideology of neoliberalism; the two combining to strip Vietnam’s people of their money and their rights while a tiny elite fills its pockets and hides behind the rhetoric of the revolution. That, finally, is the biggest lie of all. Victorious in war but defeated in peace, the claim by Vietnam’s leaders to be socialist looks like empty propaganda.

Geography 

Vietnam's land is mostly hilly and densely forested, with level land covering no more than 20%. Mountains account for 40% of the country's land area, and tropical forests cover around 42%. The Red River Delta in the north, a flat, roughly triangular region covering , is smaller but more intensely developed and more densely populated than the Mekong River Delta in the south. Once an inlet of the Gulf of Tonkin, it has been filled in over the millennia by riverine alluvial deposits. It is criss-crossed by a maze of rivers and canals, which carry so much sediment that the delta advances  into the sea every year.

Southern Vietnam is divided into coastal lowlands, the mountains of the Annamite Range, and extensive forests. Comprising five relatively flat plateaus of basalt soil, the highlands account for 16% of the country's arable land and 22% of its total forested land. The soil in much of the southern part of Vietnam is relatively low in nutrients as a result of intense cultivation. Several minor earthquakes have been recorded in the past. Most have occurred near the northern Vietnamese border in the provinces of Điện Biên, Lào Cai and Sơn La, while some have been recorded offshore of the central part of the country. The northern part of the country consists mostly of highlands and the Red River Delta. From north to south Vietnam, the country also has numerous islands; Phú Quốc is the largest. The Hang Sơn Đoòng Cave is considered the largest known cave passage in the world since its discovery in 2009. The Ba Bể Lake and Mekong River are the largest lake and longest river in the country.

Climate 

Northern Vietnam (including Hanoi) has subtropical climate with the Köppen climate classification and has times to be influenced by cold waves from the Northeast, northern part of Central Vietnam also has times to be influenced by cold waves, southern part of Central Vietnam and Southern Vietnam are hot around year.

Most of Vietnam has tropical climate. Due to differences in latitude and the marked variety in topographical relief, Vietnam's climate tends to vary considerably for each region. During the winter or dry season, extending roughly from November to April, the monsoon winds usually blow from the Northeast along the Chinese coast and across the Gulf of Tonkin, picking up considerable moisture. The average annual temperature is generally higher in the plains than in the mountains, especially in southern Vietnam compared to the north. During winter, snow occasionally falls over the highest peaks of the far northern mountains near the Chinese border. The country is also affected by tropical depressions, tropical storms and typhoons. Vietnam is one of the most vulnerable countries to climate change, with 55% of its population living in low-elevation coastal areas.

Biodiversity 

As the country is located within the Indomalayan realm, Vietnam is one of twenty-five countries considered to possess a uniquely high level of biodiversity. This was noted in the country's National Environmental Condition Report in 2005. It is ranked 16th worldwide in biological diversity, being home to approximately 16% of the world's species. 15,986 species of flora have been identified in the country, of which 10% are endemic. Vietnam's fauna includes 307 nematode species, 200 oligochaeta, 145 acarina, 113 springtails, 7,750 insects, 260 reptiles, and 120 amphibians. There are 840 birds and 310 mammals are found in Vietnam, of which 100 birds and 78 mammals are endemic. Vietnam has two World Natural Heritage Sites—the Hạ Long Bay and Phong Nha-Kẻ Bàng National Park—together with nine biosphere reserves, including Cần Giờ Mangrove Forest, Cát Tiên, Cát Bà, Kiên Giang, the Red River Delta, Mekong Delta, Western Nghệ An, Cà Mau, and Cu Lao Cham Marine Park.

Vietnam is also home to 1,438 species of freshwater microalgae, constituting 9.6% of all microalgae species, as well as 794 aquatic invertebrates and 2,458 species of sea fish. In recent years, 13 genera, 222 species, and 30 taxa of flora have been newly described in Vietnam. Six new mammal species, including the saola, giant muntjac and Tonkin snub-nosed monkey have also been discovered, along with one new bird species, the endangered Edwards's pheasant. In the late 1980s, a small population of Javan rhinoceros was found in Cát Tiên National Park. However, the last individual of the species in Vietnam was reportedly shot in 2010. In agricultural genetic diversity, Vietnam is one of the world's twelve original cultivar centres. The Vietnam National Cultivar Gene Bank preserves 12,300 cultivars of 115 species. The Vietnamese government spent US$49.07 million on the preservation of biodiversity in 2004 alone and has established 126 conservation areas, including 30 national parks.

In Vietnam, wildlife poaching has become a major concern. In 2000, a non-governmental organisation (NGO) called Education for Nature – Vietnam was founded to instill in the population the importance of wildlife conservation in the country. In the years that followed, another NGO called GreenViet was formed by Vietnamese youngsters for the enforcement of wildlife protection. Through collaboration between the NGOs and local authorities, many local poaching syndicates were crippled by their leaders' arrests. A study released in 2018 revealed Vietnam is a destination for the illegal export of rhinoceros horns from South Africa due to the demand for them as a medicine and a status symbol.

The main environmental concern that persists in Vietnam today is the legacy of the use of the chemical herbicide Agent Orange, which continues to cause birth defects and many health problems in the Vietnamese population. In the southern and central areas affected most by the chemical's use during the Vietnam War, nearly 4.8 million Vietnamese people have been exposed to it and suffered from its effects. In 2012, approximately 50 years after the war, the US began a US$43 million joint clean-up project in the former chemical storage areas in Vietnam to take place in stages. Following the completion of the first phase in Đà Nẵng in late 2017, the US announced its commitment to clean other sites, especially in the heavily impacted site of Biên Hòa, which is four times larger than the previously treated site, at an estimated cost of $390 million.

The Vietnamese government spends over VNĐ10 trillion each year ($431.1 million) for monthly allowances and the physical rehabilitation of victims of the chemicals. In 2018, the Japanese engineering group Shimizu Corporation, working with Vietnamese military, built a plant for the treatment of soil polluted by Agent Orange. Plant construction costs were funded by the company itself. One of the long-term plans to restore southern Vietnam's damaged ecosystems is through the use of reforestation efforts. The Vietnamese government began doing this at the end of the war. It started by replanting mangrove forests in the Mekong Delta regions and in Cần Giờ outside Hồ Chí Minh City, where mangroves are important to ease (though not eliminate) flood conditions during monsoon seasons. The country had a 2019 Forest Landscape Integrity Index mean score of 5.35/10, ranking it 104th globally out of 172 countries.

Apart from herbicide problems, arsenic in the ground water in the Mekong and Red River Deltas has also become a major concern. And most notoriously, unexploded ordnances (UXO) pose dangers to humans and wildlife—another bitter legacy from the long wars. As part of the continuous campaign to demine/remove UXOs, several international bomb removal agencies from the United Kingdom, Denmark, South Korea and the US have been providing assistance. The Vietnam government spends over VNĐ1 trillion ($44 million) annually on demining operations and additional hundreds of billions of đồng for treatment, assistance, rehabilitation, vocational training and resettlement of the victims of UXOs.

Government and politics 

Vietnam is a unitary Marxist-Leninist one-party socialist republic, one of the two communist states (the other being Laos) in Southeast Asia. Although Vietnam remains officially committed to socialism as its defining creed, its economic policies have grown increasingly capitalist, with The Economist characterising its leadership as "ardently capitalist communists". Under the constitution, the Communist Party of Vietnam (CPV) asserts their role in all branches of the country's politics and society. The president is the elected head of state and the commander-in-chief of the military, serving as the chairman of the Council of Supreme Defence and Security, and holds the second highest office in Vietnam as well as performing executive functions and state appointments and setting policy.

The general secretary of the CPV performs numerous key administrative functions, controlling the party's national organisation. The prime minister is the head of government, presiding over a council of ministers composed of five deputy prime ministers and the heads of 26 ministries and commissions. Only political organisations affiliated with or endorsed by the CPV are permitted to contest elections in Vietnam. These include the Vietnamese Fatherland Front and worker and trade unionist parties.

The National Assembly of Vietnam is the unicameral state legislature composed of 500 members. Headed by a chairman, it is superior to both the executive and judicial branches, with all government ministers being appointed from members of the National Assembly. The Supreme People's Court of Vietnam, headed by a chief justice, is the country's highest court of appeal, though it is also answerable to the National Assembly. Beneath the Supreme People's Court stand the provincial municipal courts and many local courts. Military courts possess special jurisdiction in matters of state security. Vietnam maintains the death penalty for numerous offences.

Foreign relations 

Throughout its history, Vietnam's main foreign relationship has been with various Chinese dynasties. Following the partition of Vietnam in 1954, North Vietnam maintained relations with the Eastern Bloc, South Vietnam maintained relations with the Western Bloc. Despite these differences, Vietnam's sovereign principles and insistence on cultural independence have been laid down in numerous documents over the centuries before its independence. These include the 11th-century patriotic poem "Nam quốc sơn hà" and the 1428 proclamation of independence "Bình Ngô đại cáo". Though China and Vietnam are now formally at peace, significant territorial tensions remain between the two countries over the South China Sea. Vietnam holds membership in 63 international organisations, including the United Nations (UN), Association of Southeast Asian Nations (ASEAN), Non-Aligned Movement (NAM), International Organisation of the Francophonie (La Francophonie), and World Trade Organization (WTO). It also maintains relations with over 650 non-governmental organisations. As of 2010 Vietnam had established diplomatic relations with 178 countries.

Vietnam's current foreign policy is to consistently implement a policy of independence, self-reliance, peace, co-operation, and development, as well openness, diversification, multilateralisation with international relations. The country declares itself a friend and partner of all countries in the international community, regardless of their political affiliation, by actively taking part in international and regional cooperative development projects. Since the 1990s, Vietnam has taken several key steps to restore diplomatic ties with capitalist Western countries. It already had relations with communist Western countries in the decades prior. Relations with the United States began improving in August 1995 with both states upgrading their liaison offices to embassy status. As diplomatic ties between the two governments grew, the United States opened a consulate general in Ho Chi Minh City while Vietnam opened its consulate in San Francisco. Full diplomatic relations were also restored with New Zealand, which opened its embassy in Hanoi in 1995; Vietnam established an embassy in Wellington in 2003. Pakistan also reopened its embassy in Hanoi in October 2000, with Vietnam reopening its embassy in Islamabad in December 2005 and trade office in Karachi in November 2005. In May 2016, US President Barack Obama further normalised relations with Vietnam after he announced the lifting of an arms embargo on sales of lethal arms to Vietnam. Despite their historical past, today Vietnam is considered to be a potential ally of the United States, especially in the geopolitical context of the territorial disputes in the South China Sea and in containment of Chinese expansionism.

Military 

The Vietnam People's Armed Forces consists of the Vietnam People's Army (VPA), the Vietnam People's Public Security and the Vietnam Self-Defence Militia. The VPA is the official name for the active military services of Vietnam, and is subdivided into the Vietnam People's Ground Forces, the Vietnam People's Navy, the Vietnam People's Air Force, the Vietnam Border Guard and the Vietnam Coast Guard. The VPA has an active manpower of around 450,000, but its total strength, including paramilitary forces, may be as high as 5,000,000. In 2015, Vietnam's military expenditure totalled approximately US$4.4 billion, equivalent to around 8% of its total government spending. Joint military exercises and war games have been held with Brunei, India, Japan, Laos, Russia, Singapore and the US. In 2017, Vietnam signed the UN treaty on the Prohibition of Nuclear Weapons.

Human rights and sociopolitical issues 

Under the current constitution, the CPV is the only party allowed to rule, the operation of all other political parties being outlawed. Other human rights issues concern freedom of association, freedom of speech, freedom of religion, and freedom of the press. In 2009, Vietnamese lawyer Lê Công Định was arrested and charged with the capital crime of subversion; several of his associates were also arrested. Amnesty International described him and his arrested associates as prisoners of conscience. Vietnam has also suffered from human trafficking and related issues.

Administrative divisions 

Vietnam is divided into 58 provinces. There are also five municipalities, which are administratively on the same level as provinces.

Provinces are subdivided into provincial municipalities ('city under province'), townships and counties, which are in turn subdivided into towns or communes.

Centrally controlled municipalities are subdivided into districts and counties, which are further subdivided into wards.

Economy 

Throughout the history of Vietnam, its economy has been based largely on agriculture—primarily wet rice cultivation. Bauxite, an important material in the production of aluminium, is mined in central Vietnam. Since reunification, the country's economy is shaped primarily by the CPV through Five Year Plans decided upon at the plenary sessions of the Central Committee and national congresses. The collectivisation of farms, factories, and capital goods was carried out as part of the establishment of central planning, with millions of people working for state enterprises. Under strict state control, Vietnam's economy continued to be plagued by inefficiency, corruption in state-owned enterprises, poor quality and underproduction. With the decline in economic aid from its main trading partner, the Soviet Union, following the erosion of the Eastern bloc in the late 1980s, and the subsequent collapse of the Soviet Union, as well as the negative impacts of the post-war trade embargo imposed by the United States, Vietnam began to liberalise its trade by devaluing its exchange rate to increase exports and embarked on a policy of economic development.

In 1986, the Sixth National Congress of the CPV introduced socialist-oriented market economic reforms as part of the Đổi Mới reform program. Private ownership began to be encouraged in industry, commerce and agriculture and state enterprises were restructured to operate under market constraints. This led to the five-year economic plans being replaced by the socialist-oriented market mechanism. As a result of these reforms, Vietnam achieved approximately 8% annual gross domestic product (GDP) growth between 1990 and 1997. The United States ended its economic embargo against Vietnam in early 1994. Although the 1997 Asian financial crisis caused an economic slowdown to 4–5% growth per year, its economy began to recover in 1999, and grew at around 7% per year from 2000 to 2005, one of the fastest in the world. According to the General Statistics Office of Vietnam (GSO), growth remained strong despite the late-2000s global recession, holding at 6.8% in 2010. Vietnam's year-on-year inflation rate reached 11.8% in December 2010 and the currency, the Vietnamese đồng, was devalued three times.

Deep poverty, defined as the percentage of the population living on less than $1 per day, has declined significantly in Vietnam and the relative poverty rate is now less than that of China, India and the Philippines. This decline can be attributed to equitable economic policies aimed at improving living standards and preventing the rise of inequality. These policies have included egalitarian land distribution during the initial stages of the Đổi Mới program, investment in poorer remote areas, and subsidising of education and healthcare. Since the early 2000s, Vietnam has applied sequenced trade liberalisation, a two-track approach opening some sectors of the economy to international markets. Manufacturing, information technology and high-tech industries now form a large and fast-growing part of the national economy. In 2010, Vietnam was ranked as the eighth-largest crude petroleum producer in the Asia and Pacific region. The US bought the highest amount of Vietnam's exports, while goods from China were the most popular Vietnamese import.

Based on findings by the International Monetary Fund (IMF) in 2022, the unemployment rate in Vietnam was 2.4%, the nominal GDP US$408.947 billion, and a nominal GDP per capita $4,122. Besides the primary sector economy, tourism has contributed significantly to Vietnam's economic growth with 7.94 million foreign visitors recorded in 2015.

Agriculture 

As a result of several land reform measures, Vietnam has become a major exporter of agricultural products. It is now the world's largest producer of cashew nuts, with a one-third global share; the largest producer of black pepper, accounting for one-third of the world's market; and the second-largest rice exporter in the world after Thailand since the 1990s. Subsequently, Vietnam is also the world's second largest exporter of coffee. The country has the highest proportion of land use for permanent crops together with other states in the Greater Mekong Subregion. Other primary exports include tea, rubber and fishery products. Agriculture's share of Vietnam's GDP has fallen in recent decades, declining from 42% in 1989 to 20% in 2006 as production in other sectors of the economy has risen.

Seafood
The overall fisheries production of Vietnam from capture fisheries and aquaculture was 5.6 million MT in 2011 and 6.7 million MT in 2016. The output of Vietnam's fisheries sector has seen strong growth, which could be attributed to the continued expansion of the aquaculture sub-sector.

Science and technology 

In 2010, Vietnam's total state spending on science and technology amounted to roughly 0.45% of its GDP. Since the dynastic era, Vietnamese scholars have developed many academic fields especially in social sciences and humanities. Vietnam has a millennium-deep legacy of analytical histories, such as the Đại Việt sử ký toàn thư of Ngô Sĩ Liên. Vietnamese monks, led by the abdicated Emperor Trần Nhân Tông, developed the Trúc Lâm Zen branch of philosophy in the 13th century. Arithmetic and geometry have been widely taught in Vietnam since the 15th century, using the textbook Đại thành toán pháp by Lương Thế Vinh. Lương Thế Vinh introduced Vietnam to the notion of zero, while Mạc Hiển Tích used the term số ẩn (Eng: "unknown/secret/hidden number") to refer to negative numbers. Furthermore, Vietnamese scholars produced numerous encyclopaedias, such as Lê Quý Đôn's Vân đài loại ngữ.

In modern times, Vietnamese scientists have made many significant contributions in various fields of study, most notably in mathematics. Hoàng Tụy pioneered the applied mathematics field of global optimisation in the 20th century, while Ngô Bảo Châu won the 2010 Fields Medal for his proof of fundamental lemma in the theory of automorphic forms. Since the establishment of the Vietnam Academy of Science and Technology (VAST) by the government in 1975, the country is working to develop its first national space flight program especially after the completion of the infrastructure at the Vietnam Space Centre (VSC) in 2018. Vietnam has also made significant advances in the development of robots, such as the TOPIO humanoid model. One of Vietnam's main messaging apps, Zalo, was developed by Vương Quang Khải, a Vietnamese hacker who later worked with the country's largest information technology service company, the FPT Group.

According to the UNESCO Institute for Statistics, Vietnam devoted 0.19% of its GDP to science research and development in 2011. Vietnam was ranked 44th in the Global Innovation Index in 2021, it has increased its ranking considerably since 2012, where it was ranked 76th. Between 2005 and 2014, the number of Vietnamese scientific publications recorded in Thomson Reuters' Web of Science increased at a rate well above the average for Southeast Asia, albeit from a modest starting point. Publications focus mainly on life sciences (22%), physics (13%) and engineering (13%), which is consistent with recent advances in the production of diagnostic equipment and shipbuilding. Almost 77% of all papers published between 2008 and 2014 had at least one international co-author. The autonomy which Vietnamese research centres have enjoyed since the mid-1990s has enabled many of them to operate as quasi-private organisations, providing services such as consulting and technology development. Some have 'spun off' from the larger institutions to form their own semi-private enterprises, fostering the transfer of public sector science and technology personnel to these semi-private establishments. One comparatively new university, the Tôn Đức Thắng University which was built in 1997, has already set up 13 centres for technology transfer and services that together produce 15% of university revenue. Many of these research centres serve as valuable intermediaries bridging public research institutions, universities, and firms.

Tourism 

Tourism is an important element of economic activity in the nation, contributing 7.5% of the total GDP. Vietnam hosted roughly 13 million tourists in 2017, an increase of 29.1% over the previous year, making it one of the fastest growing tourist destinations in the world. The vast majority of the tourists in the country, some 9.7 million, came from Asia; namely China (4 million), South Korea (2.6 million), and Japan (798,119). Vietnam also attracts large numbers of visitors from Europe, with almost 1.9 million visitors in 2017; most European visitors came from Russia (574,164), followed by the United Kingdom (283,537), France (255,396), and Germany (199,872). Other significant international arrivals by nationality include the United States (614,117) and Australia (370,438).

The most visited destinations in Vietnam is the largest city, Ho Chi Minh City, with over 5.8 million international arrivals, followed by Hanoi with 4.6 million and Hạ Long, including Hạ Long Bay with 4.4 million arrivals. All three are ranked in the top 100 most visited cities in the world. Vietnam is home to eight UNESCO World Heritage Sites. In 2018, Travel + Leisure ranked Hội An as one of the world's top 15 best destinations to visit.

Infrastructure

Transport 

Much of Vietnam's modern transportation network can trace its roots to the French colonial era when it was used to facilitate the transportation of raw materials to its main ports. It was extensively expanded and modernised following the partition of Vietnam. Vietnam's road system includes national roads administered at the central level, provincial roads managed at the provincial level, district roads managed at the district level, urban roads managed by cities and towns and commune roads managed at the commune level.

Bicycles, motorcycles and motor scooters remain the most popular forms of road transport in the country, a legacy of the French, though the number of privately owned cars has been increasing in recent years. Public buses operated by private companies are the main mode of long-distance travel for much of the population. Road accidents remain the major safety issue of Vietnamese transportation with an average of 30 people losing their lives daily. Traffic congestion is a growing problem in both Hanoi and Ho Chi Minh City especially with the growth of individual car ownership. From Hanoi, railway lines branch out to the northeast, north, and west; the eastbound line runs from Hanoi to Hạ Long Bay, the northbound line from Hanoi to Thái Nguyên, and the northeast line from Hanoi to Lào Cai. In 2009, Vietnam and Japan signed a deal to build a high-speed railway—shinkansen (bullet train)—using Japanese technology. Vietnamese engineers were sent to Japan to receive training in the operation and maintenance of high-speed trains. The planned railway will be a -long express route serving a total of 23 stations, including Hanoi and Ho Chi Minh City, with 70% of its route running on bridges and through tunnels. Plans for the high-speed rail line, however, have been postponed after the Vietnamese government decided to prioritise the development of both the Hanoi and Ho Chi Minh City metros and expand road networks instead.

Vietnam operates 20 major civil airports, including three international gateways: Noi Bai in Hanoi, Da Nang International Airport in Đà Nẵng and Tan Son Nhat in Ho Chi Minh City. Tan Son Nhat is the country's largest airport handling the majority of international passenger traffic. According to a government-approved plan, Vietnam will have another seven international airports by 2025, including Vinh International Airport, Phu Bai International Airport, Cam Ranh International Airport, Phu Quoc International Airport, Cat Bi International Airport, Can Tho International Airport, and Long Thanh International Airport. The planned Long Thanh International Airport will have an annual service capacity of 100 million passengers once it becomes fully operational in 2025. Vietnam Airlines, the state-owned national airline, maintains a fleet of 86 passenger aircraft and aims to operate 170 by 2020. Several private airlines also operate in Vietnam, including Air Mekong, Bamboo Airways, Jetstar Pacific Airlines, VASCO and VietJet Air. As a coastal country, Vietnam has many major sea ports, including Cam Ranh, Đà Nẵng, Hải Phòng, Ho Chi Minh City, Hạ Long, Qui Nhơn, Vũng Tàu, Cửa Lò and Nha Trang.

Energy 

Vietnam's energy sector is dominated largely by the state-controlled Vietnam Electricity Group (EVN). As of 2017, EVN made up about 61.4% of the country's power generation system with a total power capacity of 25,884 MW. Other energy sources are PetroVietnam (4,435 MW), Vinacomin (1,785 MW) and 10,031 MW from build–operate–transfer (BOT) investors.

Most of Vietnam's power is generated by either hydropower or fossil fuel power such as coal, oil and gas, while diesel, small hydropower and renewable energy supplies the remainder. The Vietnamese government had planned to develop a nuclear reactor as the path to establish another source for electricity from nuclear power. The plan was abandoned in late 2016 when a majority of the National Assembly voted to oppose the project due to widespread public concern over radioactive contamination.

The household gas sector in Vietnam is dominated by PetroVietnam, which controls nearly 70% of the country's domestic market for liquefied petroleum gas (LPG). Since 2011, the company also operates five renewable energy power plants including the Nhơn Trạch 2 Thermal Power Plant (750 MW), Phú Quý Wind Power Plant (6 MW), Hủa Na Hydro-power Plant (180 MW), Dakdrinh Hydro-power Plant (125 MW) and Vũng Áng 1 Thermal Power Plant (1,200 MW).

According to statistics from British Petroleum (BP), Vietnam is listed among the 52 countries that have proven crude oil reserves. In 2015 the reserve was approximately 4.4 billion barrels ranking Vietnam first place in Southeast Asia, while the proven gas reserves were about 0.6 trillion cubic metres (tcm) and ranking it third in Southeast Asia after Indonesia and Malaysia.

Telecommunication 

Telecommunications services in Vietnam are wholly provided by the Vietnam Post and Telecommunications General Corporation (now the VNPT Group) which is a state-owned company. The VNPT retained its monopoly until 1986. The telecom sector was reformed in 1995 when the Vietnamese government began to implement a competitive policy with the creation of two domestic telecommunication companies, the Military Electronic and Telecommunication Company (Viettel, which is wholly owned by the Vietnamese Ministry of Defence) and the Saigon Post and Telecommunication Company (SPT or SaigonPostel), with 18% of it owned by VNPT. VNPT's monopoly was finally ended by the government in 2003 with the issuance of a decree. By 2012, the top three telecom operators in Vietnam were Viettel, Vinaphone and MobiFone. The remaining companies included: EVNTelecom, Vietnammobile and S-Fone. With the shift towards a more market-orientated economy, Vietnam's telecommunications market is continuously being reformed to attract foreign investment, which includes the supply of services and the establishment of nationwide telecom infrastructure.

Water supply and sanitation 

Vietnam has 2,360 rivers with an average annual discharge of 310 billion m³. The rainy season accounts for 70% of the year's discharge. Most of the country's urban water supply systems have been developed without proper management within the last 10 years. Based on a 2008 survey by the Vietnam Water Supply and Sewerage Association (VWSA), existing water production capacity exceeded demand, but service coverage is still sparse. Most of the clean water supply infrastructure is not widely developed. It is only available to a small proportion of the population with about one third of 727 district towns having some form of piped water supply. There is also concern over the safety of existing water resources for urban and rural water supply systems. Most industrial factories release their untreated wastewater directly into the water sources. Where the government does not take measures to address the issue, most domestic wastewater is discharged, untreated, back into the environment and pollutes the surface water.

In recent years, there have been some efforts and collaboration between local and foreign universities to develop access to safe water in the country by introducing water filtration systems. There is a growing concern among local populations over the serious public health issues associated with water contamination caused by pollution as well as the high levels of arsenic in groundwater sources. The government of Netherlands has been providing aid focusing its investments mainly on water-related sectors including water treatment projects. Regarding sanitation, 78% of Vietnam's population has access to "improved" sanitation—94% of the urban population and 70% of the rural population. However, there are still about 21 million people in the country lacking access to "improved" sanitation according to a survey conducted in 2015. In 2018, the construction ministry said the country's water supply, and drainage industry had been applying hi-tech methods and information technology (IT) to sanitation issues but faced problems like limited funding, climate change, and pollution. The health ministry has also announced that water inspection units will be established nationwide beginning in June 2019. Inspections are to be conducted without notice, since there have been many cases involving health issues caused by poor or polluted water supplies as well unhygienic conditions reported every year.

Health 

By 2015, 97% of the population had access to improved water sources. In 2016, Vietnam's national life expectancy stood at 80.9 years for women and 71.5 for men, and the infant mortality rate was 17 per 1,000 live births. Despite these improvements, malnutrition is still common in rural provinces. Since the partition, North Vietnam has established a public health system that has reached down to the hamlet level. After the national reunification in 1975, a nationwide health service was established. In the late 1980s, the quality of healthcare declined to some degree as a result of budgetary constraints, a shift of responsibility to the provinces and the introduction of charges. Inadequate funding has also contributed to a shortage of nurses, midwives and hospital beds; in 2000, Vietnam had only 24.7 hospital beds per 10,000 people before declining to 23.7 in 2005 as stated in the annual report of Vietnamese Health Ministry. The controversial use of herbicides as a chemical weapon by the US military during the war left tangible, long-term impacts upon the Vietnamese people that persist in the country today. For instance, it led to three million Vietnamese people suffering health problems, one million birth defects caused directly by exposure to the chemical and 24% of Vietnam's land being defoliated.

Since the early 2000s, Vietnam has made significant progress in combating malaria. The malaria mortality rate fell to about five per cent of its 1990s equivalent by 2005 after the country introduced improved antimalarial drugs and treatment. Tuberculosis (TB) cases, however, are on the rise. TB has become the second most infectious disease in the country after respiratory-related illness. With an intensified vaccination program, better hygiene and foreign assistance, Vietnam hopes to reduce sharply the number of TB cases and new TB infections. In 2004, government subsidies covering about 15% of health care expenses. That year, the United States announced Vietnam would be one of 15 states to receive funding as part of its global AIDS relief plan. By the following year, Vietnam had diagnosed 101,291 human immunodeficiency virus (HIV) cases, of which 16,528 progressed to acquired immune deficiency syndrome (AIDS); 9,554 have died. The actual number of HIV-positive individuals is estimated to be much higher. On average between 40 and 50 new infections are reported daily in the country. In 2007, 0.4% of the population was estimated to be infected with HIV and the figure has remained stable since 2005. More global aid is being delivered through The Global Fund to Fight AIDS, Tuberculosis and Malaria to fight the spread of the disease in the country. In September 2018, the Hanoi People's Committee urged the citizens of the country to stop eating dog and cat meat as it can cause diseases like rabies and leptospirosis. More than 1,000 stores in the capital city of Hanoi were found to be selling both meats. The decision prompted positive comments among Vietnamese on social media, though some noted that the consumption of dog meat will remain an ingrained habit among many people.

Education 

Vietnam has an extensive state-controlled network of schools, colleges, and universities and a growing number of privately run and partially privatised institutions. General education in Vietnam is divided into five categories: kindergarten, elementary schools, middle schools, high schools, and universities. A large number of public schools have been constructed across the country to raise the national literacy rate, which stood at 90% in 2008. Most universities are located in major cities of Hanoi and Ho Chi Minh City with the country's education system continuously undergoing a series of reforms by the government. Basic education in the country is relatively free for the poor although some families may still have trouble paying tuition fees for their children without some form of public or private assistance. Regardless, Vietnam's school enrolment is among the highest in the world. The number of colleges and universities increased dramatically in the 2000s from 178 in 2000 to 299 in 2005. In higher education, the government provides subsidised loans for students through the national bank, although there are deep concerns about access to the loans as well the burden on students to repay them.Since 1995, enrolment in higher education has grown tenfold to over 2.2 million with 84,000 lecturers and 419 institutions of higher education. A number of foreign universities operate private campuses in Vietnam, including Harvard University (USA) and the Royal Melbourne Institute of Technology (Australia). The government's strong commitment to education has fostered significant growth but still need to be sustained to retain academics. In 2018, a decree on university autonomy allowing them to operate independently without ministerial control is in its final stages of approval. The government will continue investing in education especially for the poor to have access to basic education.

Demographics 

, the population of Vietnam stands at approximately  million people. The population had grown significantly from the 1979 census, which showed the total population of reunified Vietnam to be 52.7 million. According to the 2019 census, the country's population was 96,208,984. Based on the 2019 census, 65.6% of the Vietnamese population live in rural areas while only 34.4% live in urban areas. The average growth rate of the urban population has recently increased which is attributed mainly to migration and rapid urbanisation. The dominant Viet or Kinh ethnic group constitute 82,085,826 people or 85.32% of the population. Most of their population is concentrated in the country's alluvial deltas and coastal plains. As a majority ethnic group, the Kinh possess significant political and economic influence over the country. Despite this, Vietnam is also home to various ethnic groups, of which 54 are officially recognised, including the Hmong, Dao, Tày, Thái and Nùng. Many ethnic minorities such as the Muong, who are closely related to the Kinh, dwell in the highlands which cover two-thirds of Vietnam's territory.

Other uplanders in the north migrated from southern China between the 1300s and 1800s. Since the partition of Vietnam, the population of the Central Highlands was almost exclusively Degar (including more than 40 tribal groups); however, the South Vietnamese government at the time enacted a program of resettling Kinh in indigenous areas. The Hoa (ethnic Chinese) and Khmer Krom people are mainly lowlanders. Throughout Vietnam's history, many Chinese people, largely from South China, migrated to the country as administrators, merchants and even refugees. Since the reunification in 1976, an increase of communist policies nationwide resulted in the nationalisation and confiscation of property especially from the Hoa in the south and the wealthy in cities. This led many of them to leave Vietnam. Furthermore, with the deterioration of Sino-Vietnamese relations after the border invasion by Chinese government in 1979 many Vietnamese were wary of Chinese government's intentions. This indirectly caused more Hoa people in the north to leave the country.

Urbanisation 

The number of people who live in urbanised areas in 2019 is 33,122,548 people (with the urbanisation rate at 34.4%). Since 1986, Vietnam's urbanisation rates have surged rapidly after the Vietnamese government implemented the Đổi Mới economic program, changing the system into a socialist one and liberalising property rights. As a result, Hanoi and Ho Chi Minh City (the two major cities in the Red River Delta and Southeast regions respectively) increased their share of the total urban population from 8.5% and 24.9% to 15.9% and 31% respectively. The Vietnamese government, through its construction ministry, forecasts the country will have a 45% urbanisation rate by 2020 although it was confirmed to only be 34.4% according to the 2019 census. Urbanisation is said to have a positive correlation with economic growth. Any country with higher urbanisation rates has a higher GDP growth rate. Furthermore, the urbanisation movement in Vietnam is mainly between the rural areas and the country's Southeast region. Ho Chi Minh City has received a large number of migrants due mainly to better weather and economic opportunities.

A study also shows that rural-to-urban area migrants have a higher standard of living than both non-migrants in rural areas and non-migrants in urban areas. This results in changes to economic structures. In 1985, agriculture made up 37.2% of Vietnam's GDP; in 2008, that number had declined to 18.5%. In 1985, industry made up only 26.2% of Vietnam's GDP; by 2008, that number had increased to 43.2%. Urbanisation also helps to improve basic services which increase people's standards of living. Access to electricity grew from 14% of total households with electricity in 1993 to above 96% in 2009. In terms of access to fresh water, data from 65 utility companies shows that only 12% of households in the area covered by them had access to the water network in 2002; by 2007, more than 70% of the population was connected. Though urbanisation has many benefits, it has some drawbacks since it creates more traffic, and air and water pollution.

Many Vietnamese use mopeds for transportation, since they are relatively cheap and easy to operate. Their large numbers have been known to cause traffic congestion and air pollution in Vietnam. In the capital city alone, the number of mopeds increased from 0.5 million in 2001 to 4.7 million in 2013. With rapid development, factories have sprung up which indirectly pollute the air and water. An example is the 2016 Vietnam marine life disaster caused by the Formosa Ha Tinh Steel Company illegally discharging toxic industrial waste into the ocean. This killed many fish and destroyed marine habitats in Vietnamese waters, resulting in major losses to the country's economy. The government is intervening and attempting solutions to decrease air pollution by decreasing the number of motorcycles while increasing public transportation. It has introduced more regulations for waste handling by factories. Although the authorities also have schedules for collecting different types of waste, waste disposal is another problem caused by urbanisation. The amount of solid waste generated in urban areas of Vietnam has increased by more than 200% from 2003 to 2008. Industrial solid waste accounted for 181% of that increase. One of the government's efforts includes attempting to promote campaigns that encourage locals to sort household waste, since waste sorting is still not practised by most of Vietnamese society.

Religion 

Under Article 70 of the 1992 Constitution of Vietnam, all citizens enjoy freedom of belief and religion. All religions are equal before the law and each place of worship is protected under Vietnamese state law. Religious beliefs cannot be misused to undermine state law and policies. According to a 2007 survey 81% of Vietnamese people did not believe in a god. Based on government findings in 2009, the number of religious people increased by 932,000. The official statistics, presented by the Vietnamese government to the United Nations special rapporteur in 2014, indicate the overall number of followers of recognised religions is about 24 million of a total population of almost 90 million. According to the General Statistics Office of Vietnam in 2019, Buddhists account for 4.79% of the total population, Catholics 6.1%, Protestants 1.0%, Hoahao Buddhists 1.02%, and Caodaism followers 0.58%. Other religions includes Islam, Bahaʼís and Hinduism, representing less than 0.2% of the population.

The majority of Vietnamese do not follow any organised religion, though many of them observe some form of Vietnamese folk religion. Confucianism as a system of social and ethical philosophy still has certain influences in modern Vietnam. Mahāyāna is the dominant branch of Buddhism, while Theravāda is practised mostly by the Khmer minority. About 8 to 9% of the population is Christian—made up of Roman Catholics and Protestants. Catholicism was introduced to Vietnam in the 16th century and was firmly established by Jesuits missionaries (mainly Portuguese and Italian) in the 17th centuries from nearby Portuguese Macau. French missionaries (from the Paris Foreign Missions Society) together with Spanish missionaries (from the Dominican Order of the neighbouring Spanish East Indies) actively sought converts in the 18th, 19th, and first half of the 20th century. A significant number of Vietnamese people, especially in the South, are also adherents of two indigenous religions of syncretic Caodaism and quasi-Buddhist Hoahaoism. Protestantism was only recently spread by American and Canadian missionaries in the 20th century; the largest Protestant denomination is the Evangelical Church of Vietnam. Around 770,000 of the country's Protestants are members of ethnic minorities, particularly the highland Montagnards and Hmong people. Although it is one of the country's minority religions, Protestantism is the fastest-growing religion in Vietnam, expanding at a rate of 600% in recent decades. Several other minority faiths exist in Vietnam, these include: Bani, Sunni and non-denominational sections of Islam which is practised primarily among the ethnic Cham minority. There are also a few Kinh adherents of Islam, other minority adherents of Baha'i, as well as Hindus among the Cham's.

Languages 

The national language of the country is Vietnamese, a tonal Austroasiatic language (Mon–Khmer), which is spoken by the majority of the population. In its early history, Vietnamese writing used Chinese characters before a different meaning set of Chinese characters known as  developed between the 7th–13th century. , the Romanised Vietnamese alphabet, was developed in the 17th century by Jesuit missionaries such as Francisco de Pina and Alexandre de Rhodes by using the alphabets of the Romance languages, particularly the Portuguese alphabet, which later became widely used through Vietnamese institutions during the French colonial period.

Vietnam's minority groups speak a variety of languages, including: Tày, Mường, Cham, Khmer, Chinese, Nùng and Hmong. The Montagnard peoples of the Central Highlands also speak a number of distinct languages, some belonging to the Austroasiatic and others to the Malayo-Polynesian language families. In recent years, a number of sign languages have developed in the major cities.

The French language, a legacy of colonial rule, is spoken by many educated Vietnamese as a second language, especially among the older generation and those educated in the former South Vietnam, where it was a principal language in administration, education and commerce. Vietnam remains a full member of the International Organisation of the Francophonie and education has revived some interest in the language. Russian, and to a lesser extent German, Czech and Polish are known among some northern Vietnamese whose families had ties with the Eastern Bloc during the Cold War. With improved relations with Western countries and recent reforms in Vietnamese administration, English has been increasingly used as a second language and the study of English is now obligatory in most schools either alongside or in place of French. The popularity of Japanese, Korean, and Mandarin Chinese have also grown as the country's ties with other East Asian nations have strengthened. Third-graders can choose one of seven languages (English, Russian, French, Chinese, Japanese, Korean, German) as their first foreign language. In Vietnam's high school graduation examinations, students can take their foreign language exam in one of the above-mentioned languages.

Culture 

Vietnamese culture is considered part of Sinosphere. Vietnam's culture has developed over the centuries from indigenous ancient Đông Sơn culture with wet rice cultivation as its economic base. Some elements of the nation's culture have Chinese origins, drawing on elements of Confucianism, Mahāyāna Buddhism, and Taoism in its traditional political system and philosophy. The influence of Chinese culture such as the Cantonese, Hakka, Hokkien, and Hainanese cultures is more evident in the north where Buddhism is strongly entwined with popular culture. In the central and southern parts of Vietnam, traces of Champa and Khmer culture are evidenced through the remains of ruins, artefacts as well within their population as the successor of the ancient Sa Huỳnh culture. In recent centuries, Western cultures have become popular among recent generations of Vietnamese.

The traditional focuses of Vietnamese culture are based on humanity and harmony in which family and community values are highly regarded. Vietnam reveres a number of key cultural symbols, such as the Vietnamese dragon which is derived from crocodile and snake imagery; Vietnam's national father,  is depicted as a holy dragon. The  is a holy bird representing Vietnam's national mother . Other prominent images that are also revered are the turtle, buffalo and horse. Many Vietnamese also believe in the supernatural and spiritualism where illness can be brought on by a curse or sorcery or caused by non-observance of a religious ethic. Traditional medical practitioners, amulets and other forms of spiritual protection and religious practices may be employed to treat the ill person. In the modern era, the cultural life of Vietnam has been deeply influenced by government-controlled media and cultural programs. For many decades, foreign cultural influences, especially those of Western origin, were shunned. But since the recent reformation, Vietnam has seen a greater exposure to neighbouring Southeast Asian, East Asian as well to Western culture and media.

White  is the required uniform for girls in many high schools across the country. Traditional headwear includes the standard conical  and the "lampshade-like" .

Literature 

Vietnamese literature has centuries-deep history and the country has a rich tradition of folk literature based on the typical six–to-eight-verse poetic form called  which usually focuses on village ancestors and heroes. Vietnamese literature has been influenced by Western styles in recent times, with the first literary transformation movement of  emerging in 1932. Vietnamese folk literature is an intermingling of many forms. It is not only an oral tradition, but a mixing of three media: hidden (only retained in the memory of folk authors), fixed (written), and shown (performed). Folk literature usually exists in many versions, passed down orally, and has unknown authors. Myths consist of stories about supernatural beings, heroes, creator gods and reflect the viewpoint of ancient people about human life. They consist of creation stories, stories about their origins ( and ), culture heroes ( and ) which are referred to as a mountain and water spirit respectively and many other folklore tales.

Music 

Traditional Vietnamese music varies between the country's northern and southern regions. Northern classical music is Vietnam's oldest musical form and is traditionally more formal. The origins of Vietnamese classical music can be traced to the Mongol invasions in the 13th century when the Vietnamese captured a Chinese opera troupe. (alternate singing) is popular in the former Hà Bắc Province (which is now divided into  and  Provinces) and across Vietnam. In recent times, there have been some efforts at mixing Vietnamese traditional music—especially folk music—with modern music to revive and promote national music in the modern context and educate the younger generations about Vietnam's traditional musical instruments and singing styles. Bolero music has gained popularity in the country since the 1930s, albeit with a different style—a combination of traditional Vietnamese music with Western elements. In the 21st century, the modern Vietnamese pop music industry known as V-pop incorporates elements of many popular genres worldwide, such as electronic, dance and R&B.

Cuisine 

Traditionally, Vietnamese cuisine is based around five fundamental taste "elements": spicy (metal), sour (wood), bitter (fire), salty (water) and sweet (earth). Common ingredients include fish sauce, shrimp paste, soy sauce, rice, fresh herbs, fruits and vegetables. Vietnamese recipes use: lemongrass, ginger, mint, Vietnamese mint, long coriander, Saigon cinnamon, bird's eye chilli, lime and basil leaves. Traditional Vietnamese cooking is known for its fresh ingredients, minimal use of oil and reliance on herbs and vegetables; it is considered one of the healthiest cuisines worldwide. The use of meats such as pork, beef and chicken was relatively limited in the past. Instead freshwater fish, crustaceans (particularly crabs), and molluscs became widely used. Fish sauce, soy sauce, prawn sauce and limes are among the main flavouring ingredients. Vietnam has a strong street food culture, with 40 popular dishes commonly found throughout the country. Local foods in the north are often less spicy than southern dishes, as the colder northern climate limits the production and availability of spices. Black pepper is frequently used in place of chillis to produce spicy flavours. Vietnamese drinks in the south also are usually served cold with ice cubes, especially during the annual hot seasons; in contrast, in the north hot drinks are more preferable in a colder climate.

Media 

Vietnam's media sector is regulated by the government under the 2004 Law on Publication. It is generally perceived that the country's media sector is controlled by the government and follows the official communist party line, though some newspapers are relatively outspoken. The Voice of Vietnam (VOV) is the official state-run national radio broadcasting service, broadcasting internationally via shortwave using rented transmitters in other countries and providing broadcasts from its website, while Vietnam Television (VTV) is the national television broadcasting company. Since 1997, Vietnam has regulated public internet access extensively using both legal and technical means. The resulting lockdown is widely referred to as the "Bamboo Firewall". The collaborative project OpenNet Initiative classifies Vietnam's level of online political censorship to be "pervasive", while Reporters Without Borders (RWB) considers Vietnam to be one of 15 global "internet enemies". Though the government of Vietnam maintains that such censorship is necessary to safeguard the country against obscene or sexually explicit content, many political and religious websites that are deemed to be undermining state authority are also blocked.

Holidays and festivals 

The country has eleven national recognised holidays. These include: New Year's Day on 1 January; Vietnamese New Year from the last day of the last lunar month to fifth day of the first lunar month; Hùng Kings' Festival on the 10th day of the third lunar month; Reunification Day on 30 April; International Workers' Day on 1 May; and National Day on 2 September. During , many Vietnamese from the major cities will return to their villages for family reunions and to pray for dead ancestors. Many other festivals are celebrated throughout the seasons, including the Lantern Festival, Mid-Autumn Festival and various temple and nature festivals. Traditional Vietnamese weddings remain widely popular and are often celebrated by expatriate Vietnamese in Western countries. In Vietnam, wedding dress has been influenced by Western styles, with the wearing of white wedding dresses and black jackets; however, there are also many who still prefer to choose Vietnamese traditional wedding costumes for traditional ceremonies.

Sports 

The Vovinam,  and  martial arts are widespread in Vietnam, while football is the country's most popular sport. Its national team won the ASEAN Football Championship twice in 2008 and 2018 and reached the quarter-finals of 2019 AFC Asian Cup, its junior team of under-23 became the runners-up of 2018 AFC U-23 Championship and reached fourth place in 2018 Asian Games, while the under-20 managed to qualify the 2017 FIFA U-20 World Cup for the first time in their football history. The national football women's team also traditionally dominates the Southeast Asian Games, along with its chief rival, Thailand. Other Western sports such as badminton, tennis, volleyball, ping-pong and chess are also widely popular. Vietnam has participated in the Summer Olympic Games since 1952, when it competed as the State of Vietnam. After the partition of the country in 1954, only South Vietnam competed in the games, sending athletes to the 1956 and 1972 Olympics. Since the reunification of Vietnam in 1976, it has competed as the Socialist Republic of Vietnam, attending every Summer Olympics from 1988 onwards. The present Vietnam Olympic Committee was formed in 1976 and recognised by the International Olympic Committee (IOC) in 1979. Vietnam has never participated in the Winter Olympic Games. In 2016, Vietnam won their first gold medal at the Olympics.

See also 
 Index of Vietnam-related articles
 Outline of Vietnam

Notes

References

Further reading

Print

Legislation and government source

Academic publications

News and magazines

Websites

Free content

External links 

 Vietnam profile from BBC News
 Vietnam. The World Factbook. Central Intelligence Agency. (CIA)
 Vietnam from UCB Libraries GovPubs
 
 Vietnam at Encyclopædia Britannica
 
 Key Development Forecasts for Vietnam from International Futures

Government 
 Portal of the Government of Vietnam 
 Communist Party of Vietnam – official website (in Vietnamese)
 National Assembly – the Vietnamese legislative body
 General Statistics Office
 Ministry of Foreign Affairs
 Chief of State and Cabinet Members

Media and censorship 
 Robert N. Wilkey.  "Vietnam's Antitrust Legislation and Subscription to E-ASEAN: An End to the Bamboo Firewall Over Internet Regulation?" The John Marshall Journal of Computer and Information Law. Vol. XX, No. 4. Summer 2002. Retrieved 16 February 2013.

Tourism 
 Official tourism website

1976 establishments in Vietnam
Communist states
Countries in Asia
Divided regions
Member states of ASEAN
Member states of the United Nations
One-party states
Republics
Southeast Asian countries
States and territories established in 1976